Frank Chambers (born 3 March 1949) is a former Irish Fianna Fáil politician from Newport, County Mayo.

Personal life and family
He is married with four children, and is an auctioneer and farmer. His daughter Lisa was involved in establishing Renua Ireland in 2015; she is not to be confused with Fianna Fáil TD Lisa Chambers, who is not related to them.

Political career
Chambers was a member of Mayo County Council from 1976. He was first elected in 1979 and stood down at the 2009 election.

At the 1997 election to Seanad Éireann he stood for election by the Cultural and Educational Panel, but was unsuccessful. After his defeat he was nominated by the Taoiseach, Bertie Ahern, to the 21st Seanad, but was not re-appointed in 2002. He stood in the Mayo constituency at the 2002 and 2007 general elections, but did not win a seat.

References

1949 births
Living people
Fianna Fáil senators
Members of the 21st Seanad
Local councillors in County Mayo
Nominated members of Seanad Éireann